Clyde Follansbee was a member of the Wisconsin State Assembly.

Biography
Follansbee was born on November 14, 1902, in Milwaukee, Wisconsin. During World War II, he served in the United States Army Signal Corps.

Political career
Follansbee was elected to the Assembly in 1944. He was a Republican. He died in office of a heart attack on May 25, 1948, in Wood, Wisconsin.

References

Politicians from Milwaukee
Republican Party members of the Wisconsin State Assembly
Military personnel from Milwaukee
United States Army soldiers
United States Army personnel of World War II
1902 births
1948 deaths
20th-century American politicians